List of Spanish provinces by:

Area
Coastal characteristics
Name
Population